Assomada is a city on the Sotavento (leeward) island of Santiago in Cape Verde. Since 1912, it is the seat of the municipality of Santa Catarina, which comprises the central western part and much of the interior of the island. It is the largest city in that region.

Geography
Assomada lies at about  elevation on a plateau surrounded by mountains, farmland, and hills in the center of Santa Catarina. In 2021, it had about 21,297 inhabitants, making it the second largest city on the island. Assomada plays an important commercial role and has a pleasant combination of urban areas and fields. Assomada lies near the midpoint of the highway that runs the length of the island of Santiago from Praia (the capital) in the south to the northern port of Tarrafal (EN1-ST01).

Subdivisions
Assomada is subdivided into 22 neighborhoods including Achada Riba, Atrás de Banco, Bolanha, the City Center (central part), Chã de Santos, Covão, Covão Ribeiro, Cruz Vermelha, Cumbém (located in the south), Cutelo, Cutelo Somada, Espinho Branco, Leiria, Lém Vieira, Matinho, Nhagar (located in the north), Pedra Barro, Ponta Fonte Lima, Portãozinho, Tarafalinho and Tras da Empa (Traz d'Empa).

Landmarks
The market of Assomada, founded in 1931 is one of the largest on the island of Santiago, with a large variety of agricultural products and crafts. 
Centro Cultural Norberto Tavares, in the former post office, home to the Museu da Tabanca until 2008.

Demography
According to Cabo Verde 2021 Census,  there were 21,297 inhabitants in the city of Assomada.
 

The age and sex distribution at the 2010 census were:

Education

In addition to a vocational school (i.e., Escola de Formação Profissional), Assomada is home to the University of Santiago, which is a major Cabo Verdean university and a private one, an extensive school complex, including a public high school (Amilcar Cabral High School), two private secondary schools (Centro de Ensino de Assomada and Escola Secundária Abrolhos) and a primary school (escola primária). It is also home to an elite technical high school (i.e.,Grand Duke Henri technical vocational high school), which trains the most promising Cape Verdean youth in career skills.

Economy
Commerce, financial services (particularly banking), transport, and educational services are the lifeblood of the city.  Among the financial entities that contribute much to the local economy are: six commercial banks, hundreds of retail and wholesale businesses, a relatively large fleet of taxis and minivans, schools (including private secondary schools and a private university). The "summit city" as it is kindly called by its locals and the outsiders is increasingly consolidating its economic success and self-sustainability. The residents of the city of Assomada enjoy the highest living standards on the island of Santiago.

Notable people
Norberto Tavares, singer and activist
Orlanda Amarílis, writer
Victor Borges (or Victor Barbosa), Minister of Foreign Affairs from 2004 to 2008
Danielson Gomes Monteiro, better known as Dani, footballer
José Maria Neves, Prime Minister of Cape Verde between 2001 and 2016 and President of Cabo Verde from 2021–present
Gilyto Semedo, singer
Jovane Cabral, soccer player

References

External links

 Photos of Assomada on ecaboverde.com

 
Cities in Cape Verde
Santa Catarina, Cape Verde
Municipal seats in Cape Verde
Geography of Santiago, Cape Verde